Viola Group, established in 2000, is an Israeli private equity investment group with over $3 billion under management. Viola Group is focused on funding Israeli technology-based companies.

Viola Group consists of five independent investment arms including Viola Ventures – a Venture Capital fund focused on early stage startups; Viola Credit – a growth and venture lending fund; Viola Growth (formerly Viola Private Equity) – a technology-focused growth capital and buyout fund; Viola Partners, and Viola Fintech. Viola Group is based in Herzliya, Israel.

History
The Viola Group was founded in 2000 by the late Aharon Dovrat, his son Shlomo Dovrat, Avi Zeevi, Harel Beit-On, and Ruthi Simha and has supported over 200 technology companies to date.

Active Portfolio Companies

Viola Ventures

Viola Growth

Viola Credit

Viola Fintech

Exits
Viola Group has backed a substantial share of Israel's exits to date.

References 

Privately held companies of Israel
Venture capital firms of Israel
Investment companies of Israel
Science and technology in Israel
2000 establishments in Israel